"She Moves in Her Own Way" is a song by British band the Kooks from their debut studio album, Inside In / Inside Out (2006). It was released 26 June 2006 as the fifth single from that album, charting at number seven on the UK Singles Chart. The music video features the band in Tijuana, Mexico.

Track listings
UK 7-inch single 
A. "She Moves in Her Own Way"
B. "I Already Miss You"

UK CD1 and European CD single 
 "She Moves in Her Own Way"
 "Do You Love Me Still?"

UK CD2 
 "She Moves in Her Own Way"
 "In My Opinion"
 "Give In"
 "She Moves in Her Own Way" (video)

Charts

Weekly charts

Year-end charts

Certifications

References

2006 singles
2006 songs
The Kooks songs
Music videos directed by Diane Martel
Virgin Records singles